Alma High School may refer to:

Alma High School (Arkansas), in Alma, Arkansas, U.S.
Alma High School (Michigan), in Alma, Michigan, U.S.
Alma High School (Nebraska), in Alma, Nebraska, U.S.

See also
Alma (disambiguation)#Education
Alma Bryant High School, in Bayou La Batre, Alabama, U.S.
Pacific Bay Christian School, formerly Alma Heights Christian Academy, in Pacifica, California, U.S.